Austrogomphus mjobergi, also known as Austrogomphus (Austrogomphus) mjobergi, is a species of dragonfly of the family Gomphidae, 
commonly known as the pimple-headed hunter. 
It inhabits rivers and pools across northern Australia.

Austrogomphus mjobergi is a very small, black and yellow dragonfly.

Gallery

See also
 List of Odonata species of Australia

References

Gomphidae
Odonata of Australia
Insects of Australia
Endemic fauna of Australia
Taxa named by Yngve Sjöstedt
Insects described in 1917